The US Automobile was an American automobile manufactured between 1899 and 1901.  A 3 hp electric car, it used three speeds forward and two back.

References

Defunct motor vehicle manufacturers of the United States